South Hampstead is an affluent part of the London Borough of Camden in inner north London. It is commonly defined as the area between West End Lane in the west, the Chiltern Main Line (south), Broadhurst Gardens north and north-west followed by a non-road line demarcating the south slopes of Hampstead village, west of Belsize Park, and north and west of the usually narrowly defined Swiss Cottage neighbourhood. It takes in some of Fitzjohns Avenue leading up to "the village" (of Hampstead), but the exact amount is an arbitrary measure.

Notable residents and associated organisation
Nahum Sokolow, author and Zionist statesman
The 43 Group, an anti-fascist group of Jewish ex-servicemen after World War II who broke up right wing marches and fought fascists in the streets, was founded here.
Kylie Minogue, singer
ETA, the Basque separatist group, and PLO, the Palestinian Liberation Organisation, used properties here as safe houses in the 1970s.
Barry Humphries, Australian comedian known for playing Dame Edna Everage
Natalie Imbruglia, singer
Simon Amstell, comedian
Lindsay Anderson, film director
Kathy Lette, comedian, author
John Mortimer, barrister, writer and creator of Rumpole of the Bailey, lived at 3 Harben Road for ten years. 
South Hampstead High School, an independent girls' day school, is located at 3 Maresfield Gardens in Hampstead.

Nearby places
 Hampstead Village (to the north-east)
 Swiss Cottage (to the south-east) and Primrose Hill (to the far south-east)
 Belsize Park (to the east)
 St John's Wood (to the south)
 West Hampstead (to the north-west)
 Finchley Road where considered a neighbourhood (narrow linear area in the east continuing to the north)
 Maida Vale and Kilburn (to the west)

Transport

Railway stations
 South Hampstead railway station (London Overground)
 Swiss Cottage tube station (Jubilee line)
 Finchley Road tube station (Jubilee and Metropolitan lines)
 West Hampstead railway station (London Overground)

Notes

References

Districts of the London Borough of Camden
Areas of London